Legenda may refer to:

Aerospace
 Legenda (satellite system) ("Legend" in Russian), Soviet military satellite system of the 1970-80s

Film and theatre
Legenda, 1911 play by Stanisław Wyspiański
 , a 1971 film by Sylwester Chęciński

Music

Classical music
 Legenda for violin Henryk Wieniawski
 Legenda for orchestra Vasily Kalafati
 Legenda for orchestra List of compositions by Henryk Górecki
 Legenda for male voice choir List of compositions by Einojuhani Rautavaara
 Legenda Bałtyku ("The Legend of the Baltic"), a 1924 Polish opera by Feliks Nowowiejski

Popular music
 Legenda, a 2012 album by Mari Hamada
 Legenda, a 1990 album by Sheila Majid
 Legenda, a 1991 album by the Polish group Armia
 Legenda, a 2010 song by Marcin Mroziński
 Legenda (″Легенда″), a 1987 song by the Russian band Kino

Other uses 
 Legend, a folklore genre
 Legenda (imprint)